Eyal Ofer (born 1950) is an Israeli billionaire real estate and shipping magnate, and a philanthropist. He is the chairman of Ofer Global, Zodiac Group and Global Holdings.

Biography
Eyal Ofer was born in 1950 in Haifa, Israel. His father, Sammy Ofer, was a Romanian-born Israeli shipping magnate and once Israel's richest man. Eyal graduated from Atlantic College, an international boarding school affiliated with the United World Colleges, based in St Donat's Castle, Wales. In his teenage years, he spent summers working on one of his family's ships, loading cargo, scraping the boats' sides and repainting them, as well as traveling to international ports.

He served as an intelligence officer in the Israeli Air Force from 1967 to 1973. He then studied Maritime Law at the University of London.

Career
Ofer's business interests are concentrated in shipping, cruise lines and global real estate within the Ofer Global group, a Monaco-based private company focused on shipping, real estate, oil and gas, banking and investments in Europe, North America, the Near East and Asia.

In 2014, he received an honorary lifetime membership of the Baltic Exchange in London in recognition of his contribution to shipping in the UK and global maritime trade. Other recipients of this award have included the Duke of Edinburgh, Winston Churchill, and Maersk Mc-Kinney.

Ofer is ranked by Lloyd’s List which, in 2014 and 2021, named him seventh among the top 100 most influential people in the shipping industry, and tenth in 2016.

He is a frequent speaker at industry events, including the Milken Institute Global Conference in 2012, 2013 and 2015. Ofer also regularly attends the World Economic Forum’s annual meeting in Davos.

In 2018, Ofer joined the Advisory Board of the Bloomberg New Economy Forum. The board is made up of a group of leaders in their fields from business, government, education and philanthropy including David Rubenstein, Gary Cohn and Mukesh Ambani.

In March 2021, Forbes estimated his net worth at US$11.1 billion.  In January 2022, Bloomberg  reported his net worth to be US$16.7 billion.

Property
Ofer first moved to New York City in 1980 to start the family real estate business, and invested in properties on Park Avenue South, which he rented to law firms and public relations firms through his real estate company, Global Holdings. Over the years, he assembled a real estate empire having acquired a deep knowledge of ships which had made him comfortable with managing similarly tangible assets.

Ofer is the chairman of Global Holdings, a private real estate holding company specializing in large-scale commercial real estate and high-end residential developments. Its holdings include prime commercial properties in Manhattan, and a controlling stake in Miller Global Properties, a large real estate investment fund focusing on key markets in North America and Europe. He serves as Miller Global's co-chairman. Global Holdings' commercial projects include, among others, and 120 Park Avenue – the former headquarters of the Altria Group.

Its residential projects include 15 Central Park West, which was described as “the most powerful apartment building in the world” and “the most lucrative”, with quoted apartment sales of approximately $2 billion. It was the subject of a book published in March 2014 by Michael Gross entitled House of Outrageous Fortune: Fifteen Central Park West, the World's Most Powerful Address.

They also include the development at The Greenwich Lane (in partnership with the Rudin family - formerly the site of Saint Vincent's Catholic Medical Center), together with the redevelopment of 18 Gramercy Park South, 520 Park Avenue and 50 United Nations Plaza (all in partnership with Zeckendorf Development). 18 Gramercy Park South (ranked the most expensive Manhattan development in 2013) and 15 Central Park West were designed by architect Robert A. M. Stern. 50 UN Plaza is a 44-story tower designed by London-based architects Foster and Partners. Today, Ofer’s portfolio includes more than 50 properties in four countries.

Shipping
Ofer started his career in international maritime transportation in all the major shipping segments in the 1980s.

He is the chairman of Zodiac Group, a privately held Monaco-based ship owning and chartering (i.e. leasing) company with a fleet of more than 150 vessels. It is the largest operator of vessels under the Red Ensign by tonnage. Ofer has been a director of Royal Caribbean Cruises, the second largest cruise company in the world, since May 1995 and holds a significant stake in the company.

In 2016, Ofer was ranked 10th in the Lloyd’s List Top 100 Most Influential People in the Shipping Industry. According to Lloyd’s List, “the consensus view from those who know Eyal Ofer best is that he is a man who understands the markets with forensic detail”.

Ofer is said to control the 20th biggest fleet in the world.

In 2021, a merchant tanker managed by Zodiac Maritime suffered a drone attack which killed two people. The US military announced that the drone had been produced in Iran.

Energy 
Through O.G. Oil & Gas, the oil and gas arm of Ofer Global's O.G. Energy division, Ofer has exploration and production interests in the Australasia and South East Asia region. In 2017, O.G. Oil & Gas made a partial takeover offer for a majority stake in New Zealand Oil & Gas, which resulted in it acquiring nearly 70% of the company.

In October 2018, O.G. Energy agreed to acquire a 40 per cent stake in Beach Energy’s Otway Basin assets off the south east coast of Australia.

Ofer is also the principal of OMNI Offshore Terminals, the largest provider of floating production storage and offloading (FSO & FPSO) assets to the offshore oil and gas industry. Founded in 1990, the Singapore–headquartered company has delivered 23 conversion projects, 2 FPSO and 21 FSO.

Technology 
Ofer has interests in technology companies through O.G. Tech, the tech investment arm of Ofer Global. O.G. Tech is a venture capital fund launched in 2017 focusing on early growth start-ups with disruptive technologies.

In January 2018, the fund participated in the Series B funding round of Bringg, a delivery logistics platform for enterprises. This follows the fund's participation in the November 2017 funding round of Arbe Robotics, a Tel Aviv startup developing a high-resolution radar system for self-driving cars. It has also invested in enSilo and Secdo, companies which offer cybersecurity and data protection services, as well as ClipCall which brings technology to home maintenance and improvement.

Philanthropy
Ofer is a supporter of artistic, educational and cultural institutions – including the Tate Modern and the National Maritime Museum in the UK and the Tel Aviv Museum of Art – through the Eyal & Marilyn Ofer Family Foundation, which continues his family's philanthropic tradition.

Ofer is chairman of the Foundation.

Eyal was one of the donors to the Gloriana during the Diamond Jubilee of Elizabeth II in 2012.

Through his family Foundation, in 2013, he donated £10 million to expand the Tate Modern museum in London. As a result, the exhibition gallery on the third floor bears his name. He gave £1.5 million to the National Maritime Museum  National Maritime Museum to allow it to keep two 18th-century George Stubbs paintings (Portrait of a Large Dog and The Kongouro from New Holland) in the UK after a public appeal by Sir David Attenborough. The Foundation also made a donation of $5m to the Tel Aviv Museum of Art in 2019 to renovate the Helena Rubinstein Pavilion for Contemporary Art.

Personal life
He is married to Marilyn Ofer, and they have four children. They reside in Monte Carlo, Monaco. In 2008, they resided in west London and had a home in Herzliya Pituah near Tel Aviv. He also owns an apartment at 15 Central Park West, a building he developed located on the Upper West Side of Manhattan in New York City.

Ofer has built up a significant collection of contemporary and modern art, having also inherited half of his father's "vast collection".

References

External links 
 Official website
 O.G. Tech

1950 births
Living people
People from Haifa
People from Herzliya
People from the Upper West Side
People from Monte Carlo
People educated at Atlantic College
People educated at a United World College
Israeli Air Force personnel
Israeli expatriates in Monaco
Israeli businesspeople
Israeli philanthropists
Israeli billionaires
Jewish philanthropists
Israeli people of Romanian-Jewish descent
Eyal